Count Jan Wielopolski (c. 1630-1688) was a Polish nobleman, aristocrat, politician and diplomat. Between May 1678 and January 1680, he was also a Polish chancellor.

Biography
Son of castellan and voivode Jan Wielopolski and Zofia Kochanowska. He was married to Aniela Febronia Koniecpolska and Konstancja Krystyna Komorowska since 1665. His third wife Marie Anne de la Grande d'Arquien, the sister of Queen Marie Casimire Louise he married in July 1678 in Lwów.

He was Stolnik of the Crown since 1664, General governor of Kraków since 1667, Deputy Chancellor the Crown since 1677 and Grand Chancellor of the Crown since 1678.

Wielopolski was the governor of Biecz, Bochnia, Nowy Targ and Dolina.

Educated in Kraków and Strasbourg. Since 1661 frequent deputy to the Sejm from Little Poland province.

He supported King John II Casimir of Poland who wanted to institute an "election vivente rege", where the king's successor was elected before the old king died. This would allow for the king to have input in the election, giving him more power.

Wielopolski was Marshal of the extraordinary Sejm in Warsaw on 20 February - 1 May 1662.

At the end of his life he was in opposition to King John III Sobieski.

He was deft in extending the wealth and power of the family. His marriage with Konstancja Krystyna Komorowska caused (in the next generation) in overtaking of large properties by the Wielkopolski family in 1729.

References 

1630s births
1688 deaths
Counts of Poland
Jan 1630
Crown Vice-Chancellors